Events from the year 1836 in Ireland.

Events
30 January – the Intrinsic sinks off Kilkee with the loss of all fourteen on board.
February – foundation of the Ulster Bank in Belfast.
4 April – Daniel O'Connell gives a speech on "Justice for Ireland".
4 May – the Ancient Order of Hibernians, an Irish Catholic fraternal organization, is founded in New York City.
23 May – Irish Constabulary Act provides central organisation for the police in Ireland; an Act of 4 July provides for formation of a Dublin Police Office.
4 June – The Sligo Champion newspaper is first published.
August – following one of the coldest summers in over fifty years there is widespread failure of the potato crop.
19 September – first burial at Mount Jerome Cemetery in Harold's Cross, Dublin, a commercial Protestant burial ground.
End of Tithe War.
Foundation of the Royal Bank of Ireland, a constituent of Allied Irish Banks.
Foundation of the Ulster Society for the Prevention of Cruelty to Animals.
Irish emigration to Montevideo, Uruguay, peaks.

Arts and literature
Francis Sylvester Mahony's light verse The Reliques of Father Prout published.

Births
17 January – William MacCormac, surgeon (died 1901).
16 February – Robert Halpin, master mariner (died 1894).
May – Thomas Lane, recipient of the Victoria Cross for gallantry in 1860 at the Taku Forts, China (died 1889).
9 June – Henry Arthur McArdle, painter in the United States (died 1908).
10 October – Dalton McCarthy, lawyer and politician in Canada (died 1898).
Lot Flannery, sculptor in the United States (died 1922).

Deaths
31 March – Edward Southwell Ruthven, Repealer politician and member of the United Kingdom Parliament (b. c. 1772)
8 August – James Blackwood, 2nd Baron Dufferin and Claneboye, politician (born 1755).
21 August – William Cusac Smith, Baronet, judge (born 1766)

References

 
Years of the 19th century in Ireland
1830s in Ireland
Ireland
 Ireland